The LG Cup Four Nations is an exhibition association football tournament that took place in Nigeria.

Participants
The participants were:

 Cameroon B

Results

Semifinals

Third place match

Iran waited for 35 minutes on the pitch, while Ghana did not show up at all, apparently demanding prize money for the fourth place finishers (uncommon in LG tournaments).  Eventually Iran left, without obtaining any information from the Nigerian 'organisers'.  One day later, the Nigerian FA awarded Ghana third place (and the relevant prize money) because Iran had left the pitch (sic!).  Iran have understandably protested.

Final

Bracket

Scorers
 3 goal
  Yakubu Aiyegbeni
 2 goal
  B Patrick Suffo
 1 goal
  Patrick Agyemang
  Joseph Enakarhire
  Joseph Yobo
  Ahmed Garba

See also
LG Cup

References

International association football competitions hosted by Morocco
2011–12 in Moroccan football
2011 in Cameroonian football
2011–12 in Ugandan football
2011 in Sudanese sport